The R505 road is a regional road in Ireland which runs east-west from Cashel, County Tipperary to the N24 southeast of Limerick City. En route it passes through Dundrum and Cappawhite in County Tipperary and Doon and Cappamore in County Limerick.

See also
Roads in Ireland
National primary road
National secondary road

References
Roads Act 1993 (Classification of Regional Roads) Order 2006 – Department of Transport

Regional roads in the Republic of Ireland
Roads in County Tipperary
Roads in County Limerick